The Leeward Islands (literally "Islands Under-the-Wind") are the western part of the Society Islands in French Polynesia, an overseas collectivity of France in the South Pacific. They lie south of the Line Islands (part of Kiribati), east of the Cooks and north of the Austral Islands (also part of French Polynesia). Their area is 395 km2 and their population is over 33,000.

The westernmost Leeward Islands comprise a three atoll group: Manuae (also known as Scilly Atoll); Motu One atoll (also known as Bellinghausen), the most northerly of the Leeward Islands; and Maupihaa atoll (also known as Mopelia) to the southeast.

The Leeward Islands that lie more to the east are a mainly high island cluster:

Maupiti (Tahitian name: Maurua);

Tupai atoll;

Bora Bora (Tahitian name: Vava'u), which is the best known of the Leeward Islands in the western world because of its World War II-era United States naval base and its tourism industry;

Raiatea (Tahitian names: Hava'i, or Ioretea), the largest island in the group, with Uturoa as the largest city and local capital of the Leeward Islands, and the peak with the highest elevation in the Leeward Islands, Mount Tefatua (just over 1,000 m.);

Taha'a (Tahitian name: Uporu), which lies just north of Uturoa; and

Huahine (Tahitian name: Mata'irea),the easternmost island of the group, which at high tide is divided into two: Huahine Nui ("big Huahine") to the north and Huahine Iti ("small Huahine") to the south.

Administration
The archipelago comprises an administrative division of French Polynesia. The capital of the Leeward Islands administrative subdivision is Uturoa. The Leeward Islands (subdivision administrative des Îles Sous-le-vent) are one of French Polynesia's five administrative subdivisions. The administrative subdivision is coextensive with the electoral district of the Leeward Islands, one of French Polynesia's six electoral districts for the Assembly of French Polynesia (see also Politics of French Polynesia).

History

The first European to encounter the archipelago was James Cook on 12 April 1769 during a British expedition the purpose of which was to observe the transit of Venus. He later revisited the islands twice) more. It is a common misconception that he named the Leeward group of islands "Society" in honor of the Royal Society. However, Cook recorded in his journal that he named the islands “Society” because they lie close to each other.

In 1840, France declared a protectorate over Tahiti.  In 1847, the British and French signed the Jarnac Convention, agreeing that the kingdoms of Raiatea, Huahine, and Bora Bora would remain independent from either of the two European nations, and that they would not allow any single chief to control the entire archipelago. France eventually broke the agreement and annexed the islands. They became a colony of France in 1888 (eight years after the Windward Islands did). There were many native resistance movements and conflicts in reaction to this annexation, known as the Leewards War, which continued until 1897.

Geography
The islands are mountainous, consisting of volcanic rock. They are formed of trachyte, dolerite and basalt. There are raised coral beds high up the mountains, and lava occurs in a variety of forms, even in solid flows. Volcanic activity ceased so long ago that the craters have been almost entirely obliterated by erosion.

Flora and fauna
Flora includes breadfruit, pandanus, and coconut palms. The limited terrestrial fauna includes feral pigs, rats, and small lizards.  There are several species of freshwater fish inhabiting the small streams on the islands, and the fringing coral reefs around the islands contain a dazzling array of fish and other salt-water-dwelling species.

Tourism
Tourism is the mainstay of the economy. Agriculturally, the major products are copra, sugar, rum, mother-of-pearl, and vanilla.

Islands 

Raiatea (largest island of the group); Tahitian names: Hava'i, Ioretea
Huahine, which at high tide is divided into two islands: Huahine Nui ("big Huahine") to the north and Huahine Iti ("small Huahine") to the south; Tahitian name: Mata'irea
Tahaa; Tahitian name: Uporu
Bora Bora; Tahitian name: Vava'u
Tupai; Tahitian name: Motu Iti
Maupiti; Tahitian name: Maurua
Manuae (also known as Scilly Atoll)
Maupihaa (also known as Mopelia)
Motu One (also known as Bellinghausen)

See also

References

External links 
Satellite image

Islands of the Society Islands
Archipelagoes of the Pacific Ocean